The US Bureau of Reclamation Project Office Building in Montrose, Colorado is listed on the National Register of Historic Places.  It has also been known as the  Uncompahgre Valley Water Users Association Office.  The NRHP listing included five contributing buildings.

It was built by contractor J.J. Kewin.

References

Government buildings on the National Register of Historic Places in Colorado
Buildings and structures in Montrose County, Colorado
Historic districts on the National Register of Historic Places in Colorado
National Register of Historic Places in Montrose County, Colorado